3 Days of a Blind Girl (alias: Retribution Sight Unseen) also known as Maang lui 72 siu si (1993) is a 1993 Hong Kong psychological thriller film directed by Chan Wing-Chiu and starring Veronica Yip, Anthony Wong, Jamie Luk Kin-ming, Anthony Chan, Alfred Cheung, Fruit Chan, Chan Yuet-Yue. This film is quite possibly the Hong Kong version of Wait Until Dark.

Plot
Veronica Yip stars as a heart specialist's young wife Mrs. Jack Ng, who is left temporarily blind after an operation and will recover in around three days. As her husband, Dr. Jack Ng (Anthony Chan) departs for a doctor's convention in Macau and leaving her in the care of their maid. 
A strange man Sam Chu (Anthony Wong) ingratiates himself into her household in order to avenge the seduction and death of his wife in many graphic fashions such as killing the family dog and feeding it to Mrs. Ng. Dr. Jack Ng is found to be the killer of his wife thus spurring Sam to his acts of revenge. Mrs. Ng is found in many scenes to have exposed breasts.

Cast and roles
 Veronica Yip – Mrs. Jack Ng
 Anthony Wong – Sam Chu
 Anthony Chan – Dr. Jack Ng
 Alfred Cheung – Dr. Wong
 Fruit Chan – Burglar
 Jaime Luk Kin-ming – Cop
 Chan Yuet-Yue – May
 Chan Wing-Chiu – Pedestrian fighting over taxi with Mrs. Jack Ng

Box office
The film grossed HK$2,934,838 at the Hong Kong box office during its theatrical run from 27 May to 2 June 1993 in Hong Kong.

Home media
This film was released on Blu-ray on 13 November 2020.

References

External links
 
 
 Retribution Sight Unseen at Hong Kong Cinemagic
 3 Days of a Blind Girl in Hong Kong Film Archive

Hong Kong psychological thriller films
Films set in Hong Kong
1993 films
1990s Cantonese-language films
Films about blind people
Home invasions in film
1990s Hong Kong films
1990s psychological thriller films